The Serbian Patriotic Alliance (SPAS) was a right-wing populist and national-conservative political party in Serbia. It was led by Aleksandar Šapić.

It was founded as the "Movement of United Local Self-Governments" (PULS) in 2010, and in subsequent years, it served in several right-wing coalitions. Shortly after the 2018 Belgrade City Assembly election, it merged with the civic group "Aleksandar Šapić – Mayor" to form SPAS. It later participated in the 2020 parliamentary election, winning 3.83% of the popular vote and 11 seats in the National Assembly. SPAS served as a part of the SNS-led government until its dissolution. In early May 2021, SNS and SPAS began negotiating about SPAS merging into the Serbian Progressive Party, and on 26 May it was announced to the public that the party had been dissolved. It was officially merged into the SNS three days later.

History

Formation and early history (2010–2016) 
The party's legal predecessor was founded in 2010 under the name of "Movement of United Local Self-Governments" (PULS), and it represented a local civic group from Kraljevo which was formed out of many local parties and movements. After the local government reshuffle, they became a part of the majority that governed the municipality. In early 2015, they became a part of the right-wing "Patriotic bloc" coalition that was led by Dveri and the Democratic Party of Serbia. Shortly before the election in 2016, they left the coalition.

Party reconstruction (2018–2020) 

One of the candidates for the 2018 Belgrade election was Aleksandar Šapić, long-time president of the New Belgrade municipality and former water polo player, who announced that he would be forming a civic group for the election. Šapić formally announced that his coalition would cooperate with the government and the opposition too. Šapić opposed the unification of the opposition into one pre-election coalition for the Belgrade election. His party received 9% of the vote and 12 seats in the City Assembly. Shortly after the election, Šapić and high-ranked leaders of PULS announced the reformation of the party under the name of "Serbian Patriotic Alliance". This change was done without the participation of the president of PULS.

After the formation, Šapić commented that "the party will not be pro-American, pro-Russian or pro-French and that instead it will fight for its national interests". In August 2018, Šapić stated that one of the party's principles is to separate local politics from the national one and to run independently in future elections, without participating in pre-election coalitions. In late 2019, SPAS tried to form a local coalition with Healthy Serbia to participate in future local elections, however, in early January 2020, Šapić changed his mind and coalition negotiations came to a halt. Prior to this, Together for Šumadija had also joined the coalition talks in mid-January.

Modern period and merger with the SNS (2020–2021) 
SPAS previously declared itself as an opponent to the SNS government, and they had also declined any type of a coalition with other parties, with the desire to participate independently in the upcoming elections. They successfully filed their ballot under the name "Aleksandar Šapić – Victory for Serbia" to participate in the 2020 parliamentary election and it was accepted by RIK on 12 March. During the election campaigning, Šapić campaigned on promoting better and more transparent elections, patriotism, decentralization, independent judiciary, and the expansion of the healthcare system. Shortly before the election, Šapić was interviewed by Južne vesti in which he stated that he won't become a subject to the ruling Serbian Progressive Party.

In the end, they placed third, winning 3.83% of the popular vote and 11 seats in the National Assembly. Šapić commented that he won't close the doors to a possible coalition, and he ended up negotiating with the SNS-led coalition, and they accepted the offer to join the new government in October. Ratko Dmitrović, a conservative journalist, was then chosen as the new minister for Families and Demographics in the newly elected government of Serbia, while Svetozar Andrić, former Bosnian Serb army brigade commander, became a member of the parliament. Former Dveri leader, Vladan Glišić got chosen as a member of the presidency and served until his removal from the party shortly after the election ended.

In early October 2020, elections were held in New Belgrade in which Šapić's SPAS won again. Five members of the local city assembly of Kragujevac, led by Veroljub Stevanović, defected from the Healthy Serbia–Together for Šumadija coalition to join the Serbian Patriotic Alliance in late November 2020. In late April 2021, the Serbian Patriotic Alliance participated in the inter-party dialogues on electoral conditions, however, a week before they declined to participate in talks on electoral conditions with European parliament representatives.

On 5 May 2021, Aleksandar Vučić, the president of Serbia and the leader of the Serbian Progressive Party (SNS) announced that he submitted a proposal to the presidency of the SNS, which was unanimously accepted, to form a working group that will start negotiations with SPAS and its leader Aleksandar Šapić about unification of the two parties. The same day, Šapić accepted Vučić's proposal and stated that he hopes that the two parties will be united by late May or early June. A meeting between Vučić and Šapić including high-party officials was held on 10 May. On 11 May, the Niš presidency board of SPAS announced that it supports the merging into the Serbian Progressive Party. On 26 May 2021, Šapić announced that SPAS has been officially dissolved after inter-party talks and after the approval of the main board. On 29 May, a party session was held inside the Serbian Progressive Party in which Šapić was chosen as the vice president of the Main Board, and a declaration between SPAS and the SNS was also formulated. On 7 June, it was announced that the former MPs of SPAS had formally joined For Our Children, the SNS's parliamentary group.

Ideology 
Ideologically, the Serbian Patriotic Alliance leaned towards conservatism, national conservatism, and right-wing populism, while adopting pro-European foreign stances. It has been described as a right-wing party, although some sources have also described it as center-right, and far-right. Its leader Šapić, opposed the recognition of Kosovo's independence and supported a proposal for a referendum about Kosovo's status.

Organization and structure 

The structure and party bodies of the Serbian Patriotic Alliance were the assembly, the president, the secretary general, the main board, the presidency, the executive board, the political council, the expert council, the statutory board, the supervisory board and the secretariat. The assembly was the highest body of the party and it was consisted of the president, the secretary general, members of the main board, presidents of expert councils, members of the political council and appointed delegates.

The president represented the party and was a political-executive body. The presidency was an operational and political body and it consisted of at least five members. SPAS also had special organizational forms such as the Women's Network and Youth Network.

List of presidents of the Serbian Patriotic Alliance

Electoral results

Parliamentary elections

See also 

 Politics of Serbia
 List of political parties in Serbia

References

External links 
 Official website

2010 establishments in Serbia
Conservative parties in Serbia
Eastern Orthodox political parties
National conservative parties
Nationalist parties in Serbia
Political parties established in 2010
Pro-European political parties in Serbia
Right-wing populism in Serbia
Right-wing populist parties
Serb nationalist parties
Social conservative parties
Defunct political parties in Serbia
Political parties disestablished in 2021